Typhlodaphne filostriata is a species of sea snail, a marine gastropod mollusk in the family Borsoniidae.

Distribution
This marine species occurs in the Strait of Magellan off Cape Horn.

References

 H. Strebel (1905), Zool. Jahrb. Abt. Syst. Geog. Biol. Tiere	Vol. 22, p 591–592

External links
  Bouchet P., Kantor Yu.I., Sysoev A. & Puillandre N. (2011) A new operational classification of the Conoidea. Journal of Molluscan Studies 77: 273–308

filostriata
Gastropods described in 1905